The Chixoy River or Río Chixoy is a river in Guatemala. The river is called Río Negro from its sources in the highlands of Huehuetenango and El Quiché until it reaches the Chixoy hydroelectric dam (located at ), where the Río Salamá and Rio Carchela converge with the Río Negro. After the Chixoy dam, the river is called Río Chixoy and flows northwards, marking the departmental limits between Alta Verapaz and El Quiché, until it reaches the border with Mexico. From there on it continues along the border for another  as the Salinas river until it finally converges with the Río la Pasión (at ) to form the Usumacinta river which flows into the Gulf of Mexico.

This was one of the main reasons for selecting this river for the construction of the Chixoy Hydroelectric dam. Guatemala's National Institute for Electricity (INDE) is planning the construction of another hydroelectric dam on the Chixoy river.

See also
 Chixoy hydroelectric dam
 Río Negro Massacre

References

External links
Map of Guatemala including the river

Chixoy
Geography of Guatemala
Usumacinta River